Presidential elections were held in France on 22 April 2012 (or 21 April in some overseas departments and territories), with a second round run-off held on 6 May (or 5 May for those same territories) to elect the President of France (who is also ex officio one of the two joint heads of state of Andorra, a sovereign state). The incumbent Nicolas Sarkozy was running for a second five-year term for which he was eligible for under the Constitution of France.

The first round ended with the selection of François Hollande and Nicolas Sarkozy as second round participants, as neither of them received a majority of votes cast in the first round. Hollande won the runoff with 51.64% of the vote to Sarkozy's 48.36%. It was the second time in French history and the first time since the 1981 election that a President seeking reelection was denied a second term.

The presidential elections were followed by legislative elections in June.

Electoral system
In overseas departments and territories of France located west of metropolitan France (Saint Pierre and Miquelon, Saint Martin, Saint Barthélemy, Guadeloupe, Martinique, French Guiana, and French Polynesia), voting takes place a day early, so that citizens in those territories and departments do not find themselves voting after the initial announcement of results. This is also the case for French residents in foreign countries west of metropolitan France. Some of these communities are remote; Amerindians in French Guiana, who are French citizens, "sometimes live more than three hours away by canoe from their ballot box", particularly in the large remote commune of Maripasoula. The electoral campaign papers sent to these voters, however, reportedly indicated 22 April as the day of the election, instead of 21 April.

Candidates
In order to qualify for the first round of voting, a candidate had to collect the signatures of at least five hundred elected representatives among a total of more than 47,000; these could be mayors, general councillors, regional councillors, deputies, senators, members of the European Parliament elected in France. The number of signatures per candidate is not released, but five hundred signatories for each candidate are chosen randomly and their names are published. Ten candidates qualified in 2012:

Primaries

Socialist Party

The 2011 French Socialist Party presidential primary was the first open primary (primaires citoyennes), jointly held by the French Socialist Party and Radical Party of the Left for selecting their candidate for the 2012 presidential election. Voters had to donate at least one Euro and sign a pledge to the values of the Left to be eligible. The filing deadline for primary nomination papers was fixed on 13 July 2011 and six candidates competed in the first round of the vote. On election day, 9 October 2011, no candidate won at least 50% of the vote therefore the two candidates with the most votes contested a runoff election on 16 October 2011: François Hollande won the primary, defeating Martine Aubry. The idea for holding an open primary to choose the Socialist Party candidate was originally suggested in 2008 by the left-leaning think tank Terra Nova.

Europe Écologie–The Greens

Europe Écologie–The Greens (EELV) held a primary to choose its candidate. The vote was open to all members of the party and of the Independent Ecological Movement. There were four candidates. The first round was held on 29 June 2011. Eva Joly, a member of EELV and a former examining magistrate, obtained 49.75% of the vote, ahead of independent candidate and environmental campaigner Nicolas Hulot (40.22%). The other two candidates, Henri Stoll and Stéphane Lhomme, obtained 5.02% and 4.44% respectively. The second round was held on 12 July, with Eva Joly obtaining 13,223 votes (58.16%) to Hulot's 9,399.

Confirmed candidates

Campaign
The official campaign began on 20 March, but in the wake of the shooting at the Ozar Hatorah day school in Toulouse the two leading candidates, Hollande and Sarkozy, suspended their campaigns. Although Jean-Luc Mélenchon argued that to continue with the campaign was "an act of moral, emotional and intellectual resistance." In some parts of the media, Sarkozy and Le Pen were also criticised for misusing the Midi-Pyrénées shootings as campaign fodder against "radical Islam."

The following is a brief overview of the campaign adapted from information in Le Monde.

François Hollande 

François Hollande, the candidate of the Socialist Party and the Radical Party of the Left, topped the opinion polls throughout the campaign. He emphasised his promise to be a "normal" president, in contrast to Nicolas Sarkozy's sometimes controversial presidential style. He aimed to resorb France's national debt by 2017, notably by cancelling tax cuts for the wealthy and tax exemptions introduced by President Sarkozy. Income tax would be raised to 75% for incomes beyond one million euros; the retirement age would be brought back to 60 (with a full pension) for persons who have worked 42 years; 60 000 jobs cut by Nicolas Sarkozy in public education would be recreated. Homosexual couples would have the right to marry and adopt. Residents without European Union passports would be given the right to vote in local elections after five years of legal residency. On housing, he has promised to regulate rises in rent; to use punitive measures to compel towns and cities to apply the 2000 Law on Solidarity and Urban Renewal (French article on the law), which mandates the providing of social housing; and to provide public lands for the building of social housing. Hollande won the election, finishing first on the first balloting of ten candidates in April with 28.63% of the vote, and again finishing first on the runoff ballot between himself and Sarkozy with 51.64% against Sarkozy's 48.36%.

Nicolas Sarkozy 
Nicolas Sarkozy, the incumbent president and candidate of the Union for a Popular Movement, was aiming for a second and last term in office. He was consistently second in opinion polls throughout the campaign, behind François Hollande. His reforms during his first term included a reform of universities, and of the retirement age; a reform enabling citizens to query the constitutionality of laws; and a reduction in the number of public sector employees. He argued that his reforms had helped steer France through a period of economic crisis.

Sarkozy's campaign pledges for his potential second term are described by Le Monde as "anchored on the right". He has promised to reduce legal immigration by 50%; threatened to withdraw France from the Schengen Area unless it were revised to enable stricter border controls; promised to compel beneficiaries of the Revenu de solidarité active to accept certain jobs, in exchange for support in finding them; and opposed Hollande's proposals in favour of gay marriage and voting rights for foreign residents in local elections. He has also promised more frequent referendums, for citizens to be consulted on major issues.

Sarkozy admitted during the campaign that he did not visit Fukushima while in Japan after the previous year's earthquake and tsunami, despite having previously said he had done so.

Marine Le Pen 

Marine Le Pen is the candidate of the National Front, succeeding her father Jean-Marie Le Pen, who was a candidate in five presidential elections. Aiming to reach the second round, as her father had done in 2002, she also attempted to provide a different image of the party, avoiding the controversial statements previously made by her father. She has advocated "national preference" for French citizens (over foreign residents) for access to jobs and social services, and a form of protectionism, as well as withdrawing from the euro and the European Union. She has advocated reducing legal immigration by 95%, abolishing the right to family reunification, and reinstating the death penalty, abolished in 1981 by then president François Mitterrand. She held the third place in opinion polls for much of the campaign, occasionally rising into first and second place in 2011 or dipping to fourth behind Jean-Luc Mélenchon, but remained consistently behind Hollande and Sarkozy by 2012. She finished the 2012 balloting with 17.90% of the vote tally, placing her third in the final results.

Jean-Luc Mélenchon 

Jean-Luc Mélenchon is the candidate of the Left Front, which includes in particular the French Communist Party and the Left Party. (He is a member of the latter.) He has been described as the surprise or revelation of the campaign, with his level of support in opinion polls rising from 5% in October 2011 to around 15% (and sometimes up to 17%) by the end of the campaign. He finished in the first round of balloting with 11.10% of the national electorate, placing him fourth in the field of 10 candidatess. He inaugurated the practice of giant open-air meetings, which the two leading candidates then adopted in turn. A former French teacher, he was noted for his eloquent style and oratory, but also for his argumentative relationship with journalists, and occasional insults; he notably described Marine Le Pen as "half-demented". He proposed raising the minimum wage to €1,700; setting a maximum wage differential of 1 to 20 in all businesses, so that employers wishing to increase their own salaries would also have to increase those of their employees; setting social and environmental norms which businesses would have to respect in order to receive public subsidies; supporting social enterprises through government procurement; taxing imports which do not meet certain social and environmental norms; and reestablishing 60 as the legal retirement age with a full pension. There would be an "ecological planification" towards a green, sustainable economy, backed by a "green rule" (règle verte) to be inscribed in the Constitution. On tax, he has proposed a progressive taxation, with higher taxes on the wealthy and a 100% tax rate beyond an income of €360,000 (thereby creating a maximum wage); expatriate French nationals established in a country with a lower tax rate than in France would pay the difference in tax in France. Businesses creating jobs, paying higher wages and/or providing training would receive tax cuts. Healthcare costs would be fully reimbursed by the state, and the right to die would be recognised. The right to abortion would be secured through inclusion in the Constitution. Homosexual couples would have the right to marry and adopt. Naturalisation of foreign residents would be facilitated, and foreign residents would have the right to vote in local elections. A constitutional convention would be assembled, with an aim in particular to increase the prerogatives of Parliament and diminish the powers of the President; all elections would be based on proportional representation, with gender parity.

François Bayrou 

François Bayrou was the candidate of the Democratic Movement, which he founded in 2007. He is one of only two candidates to stand in both the 2007 and 2012 elections (the other being Nicolas Sarkozy); he obtained 18.57% of the vote in 2007, finishing third. In the 2012 election he received 9.13% of the vote in the first round of balloting, finishing fifth. He stands for an independent centre in politics, which he has sought to distinguish clearly both from the left and the right. Describing France as being "in a critical state", he has focused on reducing the country's national debt, through a public spending freeze, cuts to tax exemptions, and a raise in taxes (Value added tax and taxes on the wealthy). On education, he has proposed that half the time in primary school should be dedicated to the mastering of reading and writing.

Eva Joly 

Eva Joly was the candidate of Europe Écologie–The Greens. Before entering politics for this election, she was a known public figure, as the examining magistrate in criminal corruption cases involving powerful companies or individuals – notably the Elf Aquitaine oil company, the Crédit Lyonnais bank or businessman and politician Bernard Tapie. (See: Elf affair (fr).) She is also the first foreign-born person to stand for the French presidency; born in Norway, she is a naturalized French citizen. She focused her campaign not only on the environment but also on social issues, describing herself as the representative of the "reasonable" or "realistic" left, and on denouncing discrimination against ethnic and religious minorities. Homosexual couples would be given the right to marry and adopt, and foreign residents would have the right to vote in all elections. She suggested that the "ecological transformation of the economy" would create 600 000 jobs over the next five years. An agreement signed between her party and the Socialist Party contained a clause on the closing of nuclear reactors; in the final stages of the campaign, when François Hollande announced it would not be upheld, she expressed the hope she could still convince him. She also drew attention by accusing Nicolas Sarkozy of having obtained illicit funding for his previous campaign; critics accused her of ignoring the presumption of innocence, and Sarkozy himself replied that he "despised" her accusations. Known for her bright red glasses, which she symbolically switched for bright green ones, she was described by the press as struggling with her campaign, barely reaching 3% in opinion polls.

Nicolas Dupont-Aignan 

Nicolas Dupont-Aignan, described as an "anti-euro souverainist", is the candidate of Arise the Republic, a party he founded in 2008. He has advocated leaving the euro on grounds of economic well-being, and the European Union "in its current form", which he describes as "already dead" and leading to "economic ruin and social regression". He has called for an "intelligent protectionism", with tariffs on imports that result from "human slavery"; and tax cuts for businesses that reinvest their profits in France. He has described himself as a Gaullist.

Philippe Poutou 

Philippe Poutou, a worker in a car factory, is the candidate of the New Anticapitalist Party, succeeding Olivier Besancenot. For much of the campaign, he remained little known to the general public; he was described as lacking Besancenot's popularity, charisma and ease with words. Freely admitting that he did not particularly want to be a candidate, and that he did not aim to be elected (particularly as one of his policies was to abolish the function of president, in favour of a fully parliamentary system), he saw his profile and popularity increase somewhat in the late stages of the campaign, when all candidates obtained equal airtime in the media. In particular, his unconventional behaviour drew attention during the television programme Des paroles et des actes (fr), along with his unusual campaign clips – such as one based on the film The Artist. Like Nathalie Arthaud, his message was that improvements in workers' rights would come through workers' struggles and demands rather than through the ballot box.

Nathalie Arthaud 

Nathalie Arthaud, a teacher of economics and management in a secondary school, is the candidate of Workers' Struggle. She succeeds famous perennial candidate Arlette Laguiller, who represented the party in six consecutive presidential elections, from 1974 to 2007. A Trotskyist, she has described herself as the "only communist candidate" in the election. She has stated that she does not aim to be elected, describing elections as "inessential", and considering that workers will obtain new rights only through their struggles rather than through the ballot box.

Jacques Cheminade 
Jacques Cheminade is the candidate of his Solidarity and Progress movement, the French branch of the LaRouche movement. Described as a "conspiracy theorist" by the press, he drew some attention with his proposals for an expanded space programme, and stagnated slightly above 0% in the opinion polls.

Second round

Since the first round there had been a drive to woo far-right voters with Sarkozy making immigration a major issue of his campaign and Hollande focusing on the euro-zone crisis and the state of the economy. Sarkozy's move to the right in embracing National Front themes such as stricter immigration has drawn criticism from prominent figures from his own party such as former Prime Ministers Dominique de Villepin, Jean-Pierre Raffarin, Alain Juppé and Senators Chantal Jouanno and Jean-René Lecerf. There was more criticism of the German-led austerity measures by Hollande, while he also responded to Sarkozy's words at a rally in Toulouse saying that "without borders there is no nation, there is no Republic, there is no civilisation. We are not superior to others but we are different." In turn Hollande told a bigger rally in Paris that "I want victory, but not at any price, not at the price of caricature and lies. I want to win over the men and women who are angry, a hundred times yes, but compromise myself? A thousand times no." Sarkozy reiterated threats to withdraw from the Schengen Agreement if there was no tightening of border controls. He also said that there would be a presumption of self-defense when police are involved in the killing of suspects and criticised the EU's lack of mention of Europe's Christian roots in its constitution. Many of the issues were similar to that of the National Front, from which Sarkozy's UMP gained votes between the 2002 and 2007 election. He further spoke "to those French who stay home, don't complain when Francois Hollande is elected and regularizes all illegal immigrants and lets foreigners vote."

Le Pen stated she would submit a blank ballot in the run-off, calling on her supporters to make their own choices. Bayrou announced on 3 May that he would vote for Hollande. German Chancellor Angela Merkel also said she saw nothing "normal" in Hollande, despite his attempts to portray himself as such; instead she supported Sarkozy's campaign. Campaigning officially ended on 4 May.

In the last government bond sale before the election, the previously rising yields fell slightly, while the amount sold was marginally lower than expected.

International effect
The campaign has led to a "certain degree of gridlock in EU's corridors of power". It's unclear who will be the head of the Euro Group, who will join the Executive Board of the European Central Bank (ECB) and who will lead the European Stability Mechanism (ESM).

Endorsements
In the days before the election, editorials in the main newspapers expressed opinions about the two candidates. Le Monde did not explicitly support one or the other, but wrote that Hollande "has confirmed, between the two rounds, his consistency, albeit without addressing the vagueness of some of his own proposals", while Sarkozy "has demonstrated his inconsistency, first running after the National Front, crossing the red line which had been set at the turn of the 1980s, and respected since then in the ranks of the republican right, before moving back towards the centre to avoid a breakdown with his own side". Libération supported Hollande:

Le Figaro published an editorial in support of Sarkozy.

Of the candidates who went out in the first round, Bayrou, Joly and Cheminade all explicitly declared their support for Hollande in the second round, while Mélenchon and Poutou implicitly endorsed a vote for Hollande by urging their supporters to vote against Sarkozy. Dupont-Aignan backed Sarkozy, while Le Pen and Arthaud declined to support either candidate.

Debates
There was one televised debate between Hollande and Sarkozy, although Sarkozy said he would prefer three, an idea Hollande rejected. This took place on 2 May. Hollande accused Sarkozy of dividing the French and failing to lower unemployment. Hollande promised to be a president for social justice, economic recovery and national unity. Sarkozy was said to have told Hollande that his lack of experience in national government made him unfit for the task of leading the world's fifth-largest economy in a crisis.

Opinion polls

First round

Second round

French law sets a blackout of the release of exit polls until the last polling station is closed at 20:00, with fines of up to €75,000. However, the result was leaked on Twitter, circumventing the law with code names: "Flanby" for Hollande, "le nain" (midget) for Sarkozy, Titanic for Marine Le Pen, or Tomate for Mélenchon, as well as other humorous names and metaphors were also used such as Amsterdam (for Hollande), Budapest (for Sarkozy, who has Hungarian heritage), Berlin (for Le Pen, due to the Nazi past of Germany) and Moscow (for Mélenchon, due to the Communist past of Russia). The hashtag #RadioLondres was used as it recalls the coded messages from World War II sent by Radio Londres. EU-based media outlets not subject to the French blackout law reported early exit poll results before closure of the polls, in both rounds of the election. Olivier Cimelière reported that some people saw a risk of manipulating future elections.

Results

François Hollande received 51.64% of the votes, while Nicolas Sarkozy secured 48.36% of the votes in the second round. Sarkozy became the first one-term president since Valéry Giscard d'Estaing lost to François Mitterrand in 1981.

First round

Tables

Second round

Tables

Reactions
Sarkozy called for UMP to "stay together. We must win the battle of the legislatives" and said that "in this new era, I will remain one of you, but my place will no longer be the same. My engagement with the life of my country will now be different, but time will never strain the bonds between us." Hollande then spoke at a victory rally in Tulle where he said:

He then travelled to Paris, where supporters of the Socialist Party gathered outside the headquarters. He also said that "Europe is watching us. Austerity isn't inevitable. My mission now is to give European construction a growth dimension."

International Reactions
 – In electing the President of France, French citizens had also elected one of the two heads of state of Andorra. Prime Minister Antoni Martí congratulated François Hollande, expressing his confidence both in the continuation of the "excellent" relationship between Andorra and France, and in Hollande's awareness of the importance of his role as Co-Prince of Andorra. Jaume Bartumeu, of Andorra's Social Democratic Party (in opposition), described Hollande's victory as "the beginning of the resurgence of social democracy in Europe".
 – Prime Minister Elio Di Rupo welcomed the election of his "friend", adding: "François Hollande's proposals on economic growth [...] will have a positive impact for all Europeans and on European authorities".
 – Prime Minister Helle Thorning-Schmidt congratulated Hollande for his win.
 – Chancellor Angela Merkel sent her congratulations to Hollande and said that she and Foreign Minister Guido Westerwelle "agreed to discuss the kind of growth pact that Hollande has championed."
 – Prime Minister Mario Monti congratulated François Hollande, saying he looked forward to a "close collaboration" within the European framework, the aim of which would be "an ever-more efficient union with economic growth as its objective". He added that the results of the French and Greek elections required thinking about European policies, adding that in his view public spending should be concentrated on "productive investments" and avoid increasing debts.
 – Prime Minister Mariano Rajoy expressed congratulations, saying he looked forward to "fruitful bilateral and Europeans relations" with the new president.
 – Prime Minister David Cameron congratulated François Hollande and said he looked forward to the two countries maintaining their "very close relationship". Opposition Leader Ed Miliband applauded Hollande's "determination to help create a Europe focused on growth and job creation, in a responsible and sustainable manner. [...] We are in great need of this new direction as Europe seeks to escape from austerity. I'm impatient to work with him in the months and years to come".
 – President Barack Obama congratulated Hollande for his victory and invited him to the White House.

References

Further reading
 Baujard, Antoinette, et al. "Who's favored by evaluative voting? An experiment conducted during the 2012 French presidential election." Electoral Studies 34 (2014): 131-145. Online
 Beaudonnet, Laurie, and Pavlos Vasilopoulos. "Green parties in hard times: The case of EELV in the 2012 French presidential election." Party Politics 20.2 (2014): 275-285. 
 Bélanger, Éric, et al. "Patrimony and French presidential vote choice: Evidence from the 2012 election." French Politics 12.1 (2014): 59-68. Online Online
 Choi, Yun Son, and William L. Benoit. "A functional analysis of the 2007 and 2012 French Presidential debates." Journal of Intercultural Communication Research 42.3 (2013): 215-227. 
 Clift, Ben. "Le changement? French socialism, the 2012 presidential election and the politics of economic credibility amidst the eurozone crisis." Parliamentary affairs 66.1 (2013): 106-123. Online
 Evans, J. and G. Ivaldi, eds. The 2012 French Presidential Elections: The Inevitable Alternation  (2013) excerpt
 Nadeau, Richard, and Michael S. Lewis-Beck. "French election theory: Why Sarkozy lost." Parliamentary Affairs 66.1 (2013): 52–68.
 Perrineau, Pascal, ed. The 2012 French Election: How the Electorate Decided (2016) excerpt
 Theviot, Anaïs. "Towards a standardization of campaign strategies dictated by the Obama ‘model’? The case of ‘American-style’ canvassing during the 2012 French presidential election campaign." French Politics 14.2 (2016): 158-177. Online
 Vassallo, Francesca. "The EU discourse in the 2012 French presidential election." French Politics, Culture & Society 30.3 (2012): 79–95.

External links

 The Constitutional council's duties relating to the presidential election
 Opinion poll tracker with data
 NSD: European Election Database – France  publishes regional level election data; allows for comparisons of election results, 1990–2012
 A clickable map showing elections results by region, department, and commune on the website of L'Humanité

 
France
Presidential elections in France